is a Japanese manga series written and illustrated by Yu Yoshidamaru. It was serialized in Kodansha's seinen manga magazine Monthly Afternoon from October 2016 to November 2019, with its chapters collected in seven tankōbon volumes.

Publication
Kodansha collected its chapters in seven tankōbon volumes, released from June 23, 2017, to January 23, 2020.

During their panel at Anime NYC 2022, Kodansha USA announced that they licensed the manga for a Fall 2023 release.

Volume list

References

External links
  

Coming-of-age anime and manga
Kodansha manga
Romantic comedy anime and manga
Seinen manga
Sex comedy anime and manga